Pitcairnia altensteinii is a plant species in the genus Pitcairnia. This species is endemic to Venezuela.

Cultivars
 Pitcairnia 'Maroni'

References

BSI Cultivar Registry Retrieved 11 October 2009

altensteinii
Flora of Venezuela